Hypopyra padanga is a moth of the family Erebidae first described by Charles Swinhoe in 1918. It is found on Sumatra in Indonesia.

References

Moths described in 1918
Hypopyra
Moths of Indonesia
Taxa named by Charles Swinhoe